"I denna natt blir världen ny" is a song by the Swedish singer Carola Häggkvist. It was released on 14 November 2007 in Sweden, Norway, Denmark and Finland. The song is from the Christmas album I denna natt blir världen ny - Jul i Betlehem II, which was recorded in Betlehem in mid-2007.

Release history

Charts

References 

2007 singles
2007 songs
Carola Häggkvist songs
Swedish Christmas songs
Songs written by Carola Häggkvist
Universal Music Group singles